Society of Old Brooklynites is one of the borough's oldest civic organizations. It was formed in 1880.  It was founded to celebrate and remember when Brooklyn was its own city. It had an additional purpose of connecting the business community of Brooklyn.

History
The society was founded by John W. Hunter, the former Mayor of Brooklyn.  It holds meetings at the  Brooklyn Surrogate's Courtroom. Membership requires individuals to have lived in Brooklyn for at least 25 years. The group rose to prominence combatting the merging of New York City with Brooklyn. It termed this "The Great Mistake of 1898."

Notable events
the Society of Old Brooklynites has hosted an annual memorial for Prison Ship Martyrs' Monument every year since President Taft dedicated the monument in 1908.  The society also has an annual event honoring the battle of brooklyn. A Bust of Edward Snowden was placed in the park and sparked outage by the society.

Notable members
Wilhelmena Rhodes Kelly
John W. Hunter
Daniel D. Whitney
Marjorie Parker Smith
John Oakey (politician)
Myrtle Whitmore

Michael E. Finnigan
Charles J. Dodd
Samuel Booth

References

External links

1880 establishments in the United States
Organizations established in 1880
Service organizations based in the United States
Non-profit organizations based in Brooklyn
History of Brooklyn